Robert Hopkins Miller (September 8, 1927 – September 11, 2017) was a career Foreign Service officer and diplotmat. 

Miller was born in Port Angeles, Washington. Educated at Stanford University and Harvard University, he served in Europe, Southeast Asia, and West Africa. His  experience in Southeast Asia  included service as First Secretary in the American Embassy in Saigon, Vietnam (1962–65); as Director of the Vietnam Working Group, Department of State (1965–67);  as Senior Adviser to the American delegation at the Paris peace talks on Vietnam (1968–71); as Deputy Assistant Secretary of State for East Asian and Pacific Affairs with responsibility for Southeast Asia (1974–77); and as United States Ambassador to Malaysia (1977–80) and to Côte d'Ivoire (1983–86). He is a member of  the American Academy of Diplomacy. Miller served as Vice President of the National Defense University from 1986 to 1989. In 1990, he was Diplomat-in-Residence at  the George Washington University in Washington, D.C.

References

1927 births
2017 deaths
Ambassadors of the United States to Malaysia
People from Port Angeles, Washington
Ambassadors of the United States to Ivory Coast
Stanford University alumni
Harvard University alumni
United States Foreign Service personnel
American expatriates in Vietnam
American expatriates in France
George Washington University faculty